Bellamy Storer may refer to:

 Bellamy Storer (politician, born 1796) (1796–1875), U.S. Representative from Ohio, served in the 24th Congress
 Bellamy Storer (politician, born 1847) (1847–1922), his son, U.S. Representative from Ohio, served in the 52nd and 53rd Congresses